Mukhor-Shibirka, also known as Mukhor-Shibir, is a village (selo) in the west of Khiloksky District of Zabaykalsky Krai, Russia, located not far from the Khilok River,  from the town of Khilok.  Population: 10 (2002); 84 (1989).

It was founded in the end of the 19th century as a sawmill serving the railway stop #39 (also known as Vaykulichi).  Several Buryat uluses were located in the vicinity.

Mukhor-Shibirka was home to the administrations of three kolkhozes (Udarnik, imeni N. S. Khrushchyova, and Druzhba) during the 1930s–1960s, and its population was mostly employed in agriculture and railroad industry.

References
The Encyclopedia of Trans-Baikal

Rural localities in Zabaykalsky Krai